CHVL-FM is a French language community radio station which operates on the frequency of 106.5 MHz (FM) in Val-des-Lacs, Quebec, Canada. Owned by Radio Vallacquoise Inc., the group received CRTC approval on March 11, 2013.

References

External links
www.radiovallacquoise.net
 

Hvl
Hvl
Hvl